Semyon Valeryevich Tokmakov ( born 26 July 1975 in Rybinsk, Russia) is a figure in the Russian nationalist movement.  Tokmakov was a leader of the nationalist organization Russian Goal.  He achieved notoriety in 1998 when he and other neo-nazis attacked William Jefferson, a black United States Marine embassy guard in Moscow.  Semyon was arrested for the attack, spending a year and a half in prison.

As of 2004, Tokmakov was referenced as the "youth leader" for Russia's People's National Party (Russia).

The anti-fascist Russian website Freedom-online.narod.ru claims that Tokmakov was born in the city of Rybinsk in 1978, and worked as a security guard and bank protector there.

Media quotes from Tokmakov

"Why have they all come here?  They bring nothing but drugs and AIDS. Every day they harass and steal our women."
"When you kill cockroaches, you don't feel sorry for them, do you?"

Sources
The Wandering Jew-Hater Southern Poverty Law Center.

References

1975 births
Living people
People from Rybinsk
Russian nationalists